David Smith (born 15 March 1968) is a former rugby league footballer who played in the 1980s and 1990s. He played for the Eastern Suburbs Roosters from 1987 to 1991 and the Newcastle Knights from 1993 to 1994, as a goal-kicking centre or winger.

References

External links
Statistics at rugbyleagueproject.org

1968 births
Living people
Australian rugby league players
Newcastle Knights players
Place of birth missing (living people)
Rugby articles needing expert attention
Sydney Roosters players
Rugby league centres
Rugby league wingers